CBD commonly refers to:
 Cannabidiol, a cannabinoid found in cannabis
 Central business district, the commercial center of a city

CBD may also refer to:

Biology and chemistry
 Chemical bath deposition, a technique for depositing thin films onto surfaces
 Chronic beryllium disease, a lung disease and form of beryllium poisoning
 Coffee berry disease, a fungal disease of Coffea arabica caused by Colletotrichum kahawae
 Common bile duct, a structure in the human gastrointestinal tract
 Compulsive buying disorder, a psychological disorder
 Corticobasal degeneration, a neurodegenerative disease

Companies and organizations
 CBD-FM, a radio station in Saint John, New Brunswick, Canada
 CBD Media, a division of Cincinnati Bell
 Car Nicobar Air Force Base's IATA code
 Center for Biological Diversity, an American nonprofit organization for protecting endangered species
 The Chesapeake Bay Detachment, a satellite site of the Naval Research Laboratory
 Christian Book Distributors, or Christianbook, an American catalog and internet retailer
 Construction Battalion Detachment or Seabee, a part of the United States Navy
 GPA (company)'s NYSE ticker symbol

Other uses
 Components-based development or component-based software engineering
 Convention on Biological Diversity, a multilateral treaty

See also
 Cannabidiol-dimethylheptyl (also known as CBD-DMH or DMH-CBD), a synthetic homologue of cannabidiol
 CBD Rail Link (disambiguation)